The Azerbaijan Handball Federation (AHF) is the administrative and controlling body for handball and beach handball in the Republic of Azerbaijan. Founded in 1992, AHF is a member of European Handball Federation (EHF) and the International Handball Federation (IHF).

National teams
 Azerbaijan men's national handball team
 Azerbaijan women's national handball team
 Azerbaijan national beach handball team
 Azerbaijan women's national beach handball team

Competitions
 Azerbaijan Premier Handball League
 Azerbaijan Women's Handball Championship

References

External links
 Official website  
 Azerbaijan at the IHF website.
 Azerbaijan at the EHF website.

Handball in Azerbaijan
Handball
Sports organizations established in 1992
1992 establishments in Azerbaijan
Handball governing bodies
European Handball Federation
National members of the International Handball Federation